Alejandro Silva (born 7 November 1957) is a Puerto Rican boxer. He competed in the men's bantamweight event at the 1976 Summer Olympics. At the 1976 Summer Olympics, he lost to Patrick Cowdell of Great Britain.

References

1957 births
Living people
Puerto Rican male boxers
Olympic boxers of Puerto Rico
Boxers at the 1976 Summer Olympics
Boxers at the 1975 Pan American Games
Pan American Games bronze medalists for Puerto Rico
Pan American Games medalists in boxing
Place of birth missing (living people)
Bantamweight boxers
Medalists at the 1975 Pan American Games
20th-century Puerto Rican people